Alumni Gymnasium is a 1,650-seat multi-purpose arena in Lawrenceville, New Jersey. It is home to the Rider University Broncs basketball, volleyball and wrestling teams. The Northeast Conference men's basketball championship games were held there from 1993 to 1995.

See also
 List of NCAA Division I basketball arenas

External links
Alumni Gymnasium @ GoBroncs.com

College basketball venues in the United States
Basketball venues in New Jersey
Rider Broncs men's basketball